The Hieroxestinae are a subfamily of moths of the family Tineidae.

Genera
 Amphixystis
 Archemitra
 Asymplecta
 Crobylophanes	Meyrick, 1938
 Kermania
 Mitrogona Meyrick, 1920
 Oinophila
 Opogona
 Phaeoses
 Phruriastis
 Tineomigma Gozmány, 2004
 Wegneria

References